Wildenhain is a German language surname. Notable people with the name include:
 Frans Wildenhain (1905–1980), German potter and sculptor
 Marguerite Wildenhain (1896–1985), American Bauhaus-trained ceramic artist, educator and author

References 

German-language surnames